Ambience Mall, Gurgaon is a shopping mall in Gurgaon, Haryana, India. It contains a built-up area of 21 lakhs square feet and a retail (GLA) area of 18 lakhs square feet. Most floors have a shopping area of 860 meters.

Ambience Mall has more than 230 stores and food outlets. Its parking space can accommodate about 4000 vehicles. The mall was opened for public in 2007. It has won the "Best Shopping Center of the Year" and "Most Admired Shopping Centre of the Year" awards.

References 

Shopping malls in Haryana
Buildings and structures in Gurgaon
Economy of Gurgaon
Shopping malls established in 2007
2007 establishments in Haryana